Sivas railway station is the main railway station in Sivas, Turkey. Located just southwest of the city center, the station is serviced by three inter-city trains from Ankara, which continue east to Kars, Tatvan and Kurtalan respectively. Due to the rehabilitation of the Kalın-Samsun railway, only one regional train to Divriği services Sivas.

The station was opened in 1930 but the building wasn't completed until 1934. The rectangular plan building has a basement, a ground floor and an upper floor. There are two main gates one in the south and one in the north. It is registered as a cultural asset of the city.

See also
Malatya station
Manisa station
Diyarbakır station

References

External links

Sivas station timetable

Buildings and structures in Sivas
Railway stations in Sivas Province
Transport in Sivas Province
1930 establishments in Turkey
Art Deco railway stations
First Turkish National architecture
High-speed railway stations in Turkey